Ville Klinga (born 1968) is a Finnish sportsman and TV presenter. He is married and has children.

Work

Klinga worked on Yle from 1990, but in 2005 he resigned and replaced Lasse Lehtinen in hosting of Haluatko miljonääriksi? game show. Klinga also produced Jumppa, a Finnish exercise and fitness television series hosted by Anne Soini and Katja Laaksonen.

References

Finnish male actors
Who Wants to Be a Millionaire?
1968 births
Living people
Finnish sports journalists